Rafał Kuptel (born 1 April 1976) is a retired Polish handball player and current coach of Gwardia Opole.

He is a silver medalist with the national team at the 2007 World Men's Handball Championship in Germany.

Sporting achievements

State awards 
 2007  Gold Cross of Merit

References

External links 
 EHF profile

Polish male handball players
Living people
1976 births
Wisła Płock (handball) players
Polish handball coaches
People from Iława